Harold Putnam may refer to:
 Harold Putnam (Canadian politician)
 Harold Putnam (Massachusetts politician)